Unspunnen can refer to:

the ruins of Unspunnen Castle
the Unspunnenfest held there since 1805
the Unspunnen Stone, symbol of the Unspunnenfest